6,7-Dimethyl-8-ribityllumazine is a precursor for riboflavin. It is acted upon by riboflavin synthase.

Pteridines
Imides